Zhouqu County is a county in the eastern extremity of the Gannan Tibetan Autonomous Prefecture in the south of Gansu Province, the People's Republic of China, with the Bailong River flowing through its confines; it borders Sichuan province to the south. In 2010 its population was 134,000 people.

2010 mudslide

On 8 August 2010, deadly mudflows caused by torrential rain struck the county and killed at least 1,471 people. It has been said by some experts; such as Professor Fan Xiao, a Sichuan-based geologist; that the scale of the disaster was affected by deforestation and the construction of dams for hydro-electricity in the area.

According to historical records, Chengguan Town (Chinese: 城关镇, the county seat area) has been struck by 11 "devastating" mudflows since 1823.

Administrative divisions
Zhouqu County (舟曲县) is divided to 11 towns and 4 townships.
Towns

Townships

Climate

See also
 List of administrative divisions of Gansu

References

 

Zhugqu County
Gannan Tibetan Autonomous Prefecture